Silver Lake Mountain is a 2,372 ft mountain in the North-Eastern Adirondacks located near Ausable Forks, NY.

Silver Lake Mountain is a popular, easier hike in the region. A trail starting from Silver Lake Rd leads 0.9 miles up the mountain to the summit offering views of the surrounding lakes and mountains, including Whiteface Mountain.

References

Mountains of Clinton County, New York